Such a Long Journey may refer to:

Such a Long Journey (novel)
Such a Long Journey (film)

See also
Journey of the Magi, a 1927 poem by T. S. Eliot which includes the line "For a journey, and such a long journey"